Ekulo Senior Secondary School is a school near Omuthiya in the Oshikoto Region of Namibia. It opened in 1997 and has around 450 learners from grades 8–12. Most of the learners stay in the hostel. Ekulo SSS was officially opened on 17 June 2000 by Sam Nujoma, then president of the Republic of Namibia.

See also
 Education in Namibia
 List of schools in Namibia

References 

Schools in Oshikoto Region